"Soomaaliyeey toosoo" ("Somalis, Wake Up") was the national anthem of Somalia from 2000 until August 2012. It was adopted by the Transitional National Government, replacing the unnamed former national anthem.

The lyrics of the Somalia National Anthem were composed by Cali Mire Cawaale The narration was sung by Yusuf Haji Adam..

History
"Soomaaliyeey toosoo" is a well-known Somali song that dates from the early 1940s. It was first composed by Cali Mire Cawaale and sung by Yusuf Haji Adam and Ali Mire. sometime in the 1940s.

It was sung to mark independence day on July 1, 1960, and was regularly performed by children in the mornings at schools. "Soomaaliyeey toosoo" was officially adopted in July 2000 to mark the 40th anniversary of Somalian independence.

In August 2012, following the endorsement of Somalia's new Provisional Constitution, "Soomaaliyeey toosoo" was replaced as the national anthem by "Qolobaa Calankeed".

Lyrics

See also

 History of Somalia
 Flag of Somalia
 National anthem of Somalia (1960–2000)
 Qolobaa Calankeed, the national anthem 2012–present

Notes

References
Somalia: Soomaaliyeey toosoo - Audio of the national anthem of Somalia, with information and lyrics

External links
 Somalia: Soomaaliyeey toosoo - Audio of the national anthem of Somalia, with information and lyrics
 Soomaaliyeey toosoo - Performed by Cabdilaahi Qarshe

Historical national anthems
Somalian music
National symbols of Somalia
2000 in Somalia
African anthems